Jorge Tolentino (born 1963) is a Cape Verdean politician, writer, diplomat and lawyer. He served as the Minister of Defence and Minister of Foreign Affairs.

Background and education 
Tolentino was born in Mindelo, St. Vicente Island, Cape Verde. He received a bachelor’s degree in Law from the University of Coimbra in Portugal.

Career 
Tolentino has held various positions in the government. He was an Advisor to the former President of Cape Verde Antonio Mascarenhas Monteiro. He has represented Cape Verde in Finland, Spain, Czech Republic and Germany. He is also an Author and he holds positions in the Cape Verdean Writers Association.

References 

Living people
1963 births
Cape Verdean diplomats
Cape Verdean writers
Cape Verdean lawyers
Defense ministers of Cape Verde
Foreign ministers of Cape Verde